Shaanxi Laochenggen is a football club which plays in Xian, Shaanxi. Their home stadium is the 50,100 seater Jiaodaruisun Stadium. They play in China Amateur League.

External links
Shaanxi Laochenggen logo

Football clubs in China
Association football clubs established in 2012
2012 establishments in China